Fraxinus dimorpha is a species of ash tree native to Morocco and Algeria in Northern Africa. An example occurrence of F. dimorpha is the Ourika River Valley, which is also the sole location within the High Atlas Range where the endangered primate Barbary macaque, Macaca sylvanus is known to occur, is the southernmost species of the genus in the world.

References
 California Agricultural Experiment Station (1896) Report of the Agricultural Experiment Station of the University of California Item notes: 1894-1895
 C. Michael Hogan (2008) Barbary Macaque: Macaca sylvanus, Globaltwitcher.com, ed. Nicklas Stromberg

Line notes

Flora of Algeria
dimorpha
Trees of Algeria
Trees of Morocco